The heats for the men's 50 metre breaststroke race at the 2009 World Championships took place in the morning and evening of 28 July and the final took place in the evening session of 29 July at the Foro Italico in Rome, Italy.

Records
Prior to this competition, the existing world and competition records were as follows:

The following records were established during the competition:

Results

Heats

Semifinals

Final

See also
Swimming at the 2007 World Aquatics Championships – Men's 50 metre breaststroke

References

External links 
Heats Results
Semifinals Results
Final Results

Breaststroke Men 50